The North American Manx Museum in Platteville, Wisconsin, at University of Wisconsin–Platteville, in the United States was opened in 2012. It relates to the Isle of Man, located between Ireland and Britain, and to the heritage of Manx immigrants who came to the United States.

See also
Manx Museum, in Douglas, Isle of Man

References

External links
Official website

Ethnic museums in Wisconsin
University of Wisconsin–Platteville
Museums in Grant County, Wisconsin